August Robert Zimmermann (1815–1864), a landscape painter, was born at Zittau. Among his pictures are The Innthal, near Kufstcin, and a Waterfall, both dated 1863. He died at Munich.  He was the brother of painters Albert, Richard, and Max Zimmermann.

References

1815 births
1864 deaths
19th-century German painters
19th-century German male artists
German male painters
People from Zittau